Giacinto Bondioli (1596–1636) was an Italian Dominican prior and composer. He was composer at Il convento de' PP. Predicatori di S. Domenico in Venice, and uncle and probably teacher of Biagio Marini.

References

1596 births
1636 deaths
Renaissance composers
Italian Dominicans
Italian male classical composers
Italian classical composers